All Together Now is a German reality television music competition which began airing on Sat.1 on 27 May 2022, based on the concept of the British show of the same name, All Together Now and its international series. It was presented by Melissa Khalaj.

Format
In every episode, a range of singers take to the stage, but waiting to judge each performance is 'The 100' – a unique panel of one hundred music experts and performers from across Germany.

The heats
During each heat, performers try and outscore their competitors in order to earn a seat on the top three podium. Whenever a performer scores high enough for a podium place, the act in 3rd place is eliminated as a result.

Prior to filming, all performers choose the song they want to sing. The 100 learn the words to all the songs before the show, but they don't know who is going to come out and sing said songs to them. Each song is approximately 100 seconds long, but importantly the 100 can only join in for the final 40 seconds as signified by a lighting change. This means that the 100 have the same amount of time to join in the singing for every act.

Tie-breaks
In the event of a tied score, the 100 review the full performances of both acts on monitors in studio. One member from the 100 decide which act they prefer. The act who was selected takes their seat on the podium, meaning that the act with the fewer votes either drops down a podium place or exits the competition.

The final and the prize
For the final at the end of the show, scores are reset to zero and the three finalists perform again in front of The 100 with a new song chosen from a given shortlist, the performer in 1st place has priority. The act with the highest score after this final sing off wins the episode and with it a cash prize of €10,000.

Production
On 2018–2019, it was announced that RTL would air the show, with the name Sing mit mir, but later EndemolShine Germany announced that the show will not be airing on RTL. In June 2021, Sat.1 announced that the show would air in 2022, with the name All Together Now.

It was rumored that Luke Mockridge, would present the show. In October 2021, Sat.1 announced that the presenter will be Melissa Khalaj.

Performances
 Key
  – Artist advanced to the finals with an all-100 stand up
  – Artist advanced to the finals the highest score
  – Artist advanced to the finals in either 2nd or 3rd place
  – Artist score enough points to place in the Top 3 but was moved out and eliminated
  – Artist didn't score enough points to place in the Top 3 and was directly eliminated

Episode 1 (27 May)
Opening song: "Hey Ya!" by Outkast (Melissa Khalaj and the 100)
 Running order

Final

Episode 2 (3 June)
Opening song: "(You Gotta) Fight for Your Right (To Party!)" by Beastie Boys (Melissa Khalaj and the 100)
 Running order

Final

Episode 3 (10 June)
Opening song: "Relight My Fire" by Take That feat. Lulu (Melissa Khalaj and the 100)
 Running order

Final

Episode 4 (17 June)
Opening song: "Uptown Girl" by Billy Joel (Melissa Khalaj and the 100)
 Running order

Final

Episode 5 (24 June)
Opening song: "Karma Chameleon" by Culture Club (Melissa Khalaj and the 100)
 Running order

Final

Episode 6 (1 July)
Opening song: "Love Shack" by The B-52's (Melissa Khalaj and the 100)
 Running order

Final

The 100
The 100 are a range of music experts and performers from across Germany. Members of the 100 include:
 Adi Amati, Soul singer
 Alexander Herzog, Music performer
 Amin Afify, Singer and songwriter
 Andreas Melzer, Entertainer and DJ
 Andy Brings, Rock 'N' Roll singer, Producer, filmmaker and former member of the Sodom
 Aytug Gün, Singer and TV-Realitystar
 Bethany Barber, singer
 Bianca Körner, singer
 Carina Fitzi, Musical actress and member of the group Die Dirndln
 Charles Simmons, Vocal Coach
 Chris Koch, Singer and member of the group Boore
 Christine Ladda, singer
 Christopher Meyer, Singer and member of the group FÆM
 Clarissa Karnikowski, member of the group The Pearlettes
 Daniel Töplitzer, member of the group Die 3 Liköre
 Dave Grunewald, singer and former member of the Annisokay
 David E. Moore, Musician
 Deborah Woodson, Singer, songwriter and Vocal Coach
 Elada Sumanschii, Singer
 Esther Filly, Singer
 Frank Jakob, member of the group Die 3 Liköre
 Freddie Mandera, Country Musiker
 Gerrit Winter, Singer, presenter and vocal coach
 Giacomo di Benedetto, member of the group Die 3 Liköre
 Gisele Abramoff, Pop Dance singer and songwriter
 Giulia Wahn, Event manager and pop/soul/jazz singer
 Graham Candy, Singer-songwriter and Actor
 Hannah Valentin "VALENTIN", Singer and Producer
 Igor Epstein,  Musician and Producer
 Ina Krabes, Singer
 Inka Auhagen, Songwriter, actress and presenter
 Jan Felix Brüseke, Musician, Management consultant and coach
 Jana Hohmann, member of the group Janou
 Jaqueline Bloem, Singer and member of the group Jacky & The Two Strokes
 Jasmin Shaudeen, member of the group The Pearlettes
 Jason Anousheh, Singer
 Jazzy Gudd, German singer, TV actress and presenter
 Judith van Hel, Punk rock singer
 Lenny Pojarov, Singer
 Linda Teodosiu, Singer
 Lisette Whitter, Singer
 Lucas Pinnow "Mücke", Singer
 Lukas Otte, Singer
 Magdalena Bönisch, Musical actress and member of the group Die Dirndln
 Maggie Mackenthun, member of the group Kozmic Blue
 Malte Fuhrer, Singer and actor
 Maria Nicolaides, Singer
 Marius Tilly, member of the group Janou
 Markus Grimm, Singer
 Martin Holtgreve, Singer
 Marvin A. Smith, Singer
 Mascha Winkels, also known as Frau Winzig, Singer-songwriter
 MC Fitti, German rapper
 Micha Hirsch, Singer, songwriter and entertainer
 Michael Wurst, Singer and stadium announcer
 Michel Gosewisch-Walk "Gloria Viagra", Drag Queen and DJ
 Michelle Hoffmann "Liah", Singer
 Mishell Ivon Walton, Singer
 Nadir Alami, Singer
 Natascha Garcia, Singer
 Neo Marks, Singer and Songwriter
 Nicola Anfuso "Nico David", Singer
 Nikoleta Kungurceva "Émina", Singer
 Nilz Bokelberg, TV and radio host, podcaster, singer and author
 Pam Pengco, Drag Queen and Singer
 Pamela Falcon, Singer
 Pat Bernetti, DJ and Singer
 Penni Jo Blatterman, Singer
 Percival Duke, Rock singer and songwriter
 Peter Brüne, Singer
 Ratan Julian Jhaveri, Singer, Producer and Music Supervisor for Disney musicals
 Ray Scott Pardue, Singer, songwriter and member of the German-American band 2THEUNIVERSE
 Roman Petermann, Singer and entertainer
 Sahira Awad, Rapper and author
 Saja-Christin Hüllsieck, Singer
 Sandhy Sondoro, Singer
 Sandy Djordjevic "Sandy Dae", Singer, rapper, songwriter and producer
 Sarah Proske, Singer
 SaraJane McMinn, Singer and songwriter
 Sascha Salvati, Singer and former member of the Room 2012
 Sharron Levy, Singer and songwriter
 Sofia Andersson, Singer
 Sora Gebel, Vocal Coach, Producer and Songwriter
 Stefan Track, Singer
 Stinny Stone, Performer, DJ and Designer
 Suzie Kerstgens, singer, lyricist and lead vocalist and co-founder of German pop band Klee
 Sven Bensmann, Musician, comedian and presenter
 Tabea Grün, Singer
 Tallana Gabriel, Singer and model
 Thomas Katrozan, Singer
 Thomas Wohlfahrt, Singer and musician
 Tialda van Slogteren, Singer, model, TV actress and former member of the Room 2012
 Tomasz Reichelt "Diva Tomasz", Singer and dancer
 Timo Scharf, Singer
 Tobias Haase, Singer, songwriter and director
 Tony Fazio, Singer
 Verena Mackenberg, member of the group The Pearlettes
 Viktoria Savenko, Singer and songwriter
 Wanda Kay, Schlager singer
 Yasmin Reese, Singer

References

External links 
 Official website on Sat1.de
 All Together Now on fernsehserien.de

All Together Now (franchise)
2022 German television series debuts
2020s German television series
2022 German television seasons
Sat.1 original programming
Television series by Endemol
Singing talent shows
German-language television shows